Ronald Longjam (born 10 August 1997) is an Indian cricketer. He made his List A debut on 13 October 2019, for Manipur in the 2019–20 Vijay Hazare Trophy.

References

External links
 

1997 births
Living people
Indian cricketers
Manipur cricketers
Place of birth missing (living people)